Marco Mayr (born 19 July 1960) is a Swiss middle-distance runner. He competed in the men's 800 metres at the 1984 Summer Olympics.

References

1960 births
Living people
Athletes (track and field) at the 1984 Summer Olympics
Swiss male middle-distance runners
Olympic athletes of Switzerland
Place of birth missing (living people)